Simone Frances McGurk (born 5 December 1963) is an Australian politician. She is the member of the Western Australian Legislative Assembly for the seat of Fremantle, and Minister for Community Services, Children's Interests and Women's Interests.

Prior to entering Parliament, McGurk was Secretary of UnionsWA, Western Australia's peak trade union body, having previously served as an official of the Australian Manufacturing Workers Union and United Voice. She also served as a member of the Western Australian State Training Board, and on the board of the Industry superannuation fund, AustralianSuper. McGurk has also worked as a producer for the Australian Broadcasting Corporation, and in native title for the Yamatji Land and Sea Council.

In Government
On 17 March 2017, McGurk was sworn in as Minister for Child Protection; Women's Interests; Prevention of Family and Domestic Violence; Community Services.

McGurk oversaw significant family and Domestic violence reforms and introduced legislation for safe access zones around Abortion clinics.

References

1963 births
Living people
Members of the Western Australian Legislative Assembly
Politicians from Perth, Western Australia
Australian Labor Party members of the Parliament of Western Australia
21st-century Australian politicians
21st-century Australian women politicians
Women members of the Western Australian Legislative Assembly